Rehlinger is a German surname. Notable people with the surname include:

 Anke Rehlinger (born 1976), German politician
 Ludwig A. Rehlinger (born 1927), German jurist

See also
 Ehlinger
 Remlinger

German-language surnames
German toponymic surnames